Grigore Ciupitu (born 13 September 1948) is a Romanian former footballer who started his career as a forward, but later played as a left defender and sweeper. After he ended his playing career, Ciupitu worked for a short while as a manager for Aurul Brad and later as a police officer. In 2003 Ciupitu received the Honorary Citizen of Craiova title.

Honours
Universitatea Craiova
Divizia A: 1980–81
Cupa României runner-up: 1974–75

Notes

References

External links
Grigore Ciupitu at Labtof.ro

1948 births
Living people
Romanian footballers
Association football defenders
Liga I players
Liga II players
AFC Dacia Unirea Brăila players
FC Petrolul Ploiești players
CS Universitatea Craiova players
CSM Jiul Petroșani players
Chimia Râmnicu Vâlcea players
FC Drobeta-Turnu Severin players
Footballers from Bucharest